Edmundo Ohaco (12 July 1926 – 12 October 1995) was a Chilean hurdler. He competed in the men's 110 metres hurdles at the 1952 Summer Olympics.

References

External links

1926 births
1995 deaths
Athletes (track and field) at the 1952 Summer Olympics
Chilean male hurdlers
Olympic athletes of Chile
Place of birth missing